Werner Bleiner (born 26 May 1946) is an Austrian former alpine skier who competed in the 1968 Winter Olympics and 1972 Winter Olympics.

External links
 
 
 Les-Sports.info

1946 births
Living people
Austrian male alpine skiers
Olympic alpine skiers of Austria
Alpine skiers at the 1968 Winter Olympics
Alpine skiers at the 1972 Winter Olympics